is a railway station on the Tobu Utsunomiya Line in Mibu, Tochigi, Japan, operated by the private railway operator Tobu Railway. The station is numbered "TN-34".

Lines

Station layout
The station consists of two opposed side platforms connected to the station building by a level crossing.

Platforms

Adjacent stations

History
Kuniya Station opened on 11 August 1931.
From 17 March 2012, station numbering was introduced on all Tobu lines, with Kuniya Station becoming "TN-34".

Surrounding area
Mibu Toy Museum
Mibu Post Office

See also
 List of railway stations in Japan

References

External links

  

Railway stations in Tochigi Prefecture
Stations of Tobu Railway
Railway stations in Japan opened in 1931
Tobu Utsunomiya Line
Mibu, Tochigi